The 2014 Women's World Snooker Championship was a women's snooker tournament that took place at the Northern Snooker in Leeds in April 2014. The event was the 2014 edition of the World Women's Snooker Championship first held in 1976. It was won by England's Reanne Evans, who defeated Hong Kong's Ng On-yee 6–0 in the final to win her tenth consecutive world title. The competition was sponsored by Eden Resources and had a total prize fund of £5,000.

Players competed in Round Robin groups to determine the sixteen players for the knockout stages. Evans won all twelve  in her group matches, and lost frames only to Wendy Jans in the knockout stages. The highest  of the competition was a 79 compiled by Jessica Woods in the group stages, whilst the highest break of the knockout stages was 69 by Evans.

Prize money 
Source: Snooker Scene Magazine

Winner: £1,500
Runner-up: £1,000
Losing semi-finalists: £400
Losing quarter-finalists: £200
Last 16 losers: £100

Knockout stage

Players listed in bold indicate match winner.

Other events 
A number of other events took place around the World Championship.

 Plate Final: Jenny Poulter beat Katrina Wan 3–0 (The plate competition was for players who did not reach the knockout stage of the main competition)
 Seniors Final: Chitra Magimairaj beat Alena Asmolava 3–0
 Under-21 Final: Hannah Jones beat Yana Shut 3–1
 Women's Pairs Final: Ng On-yee and So Man Yan beat Reanne Evans and Anita Maflin 3–2
 Mixed Pairs Final: Yana Shut and Ben Woollaston beat Wendy Jans and Jamie Clarke 3–0

References 

Women's World Snooker Championship
Women's World Championship
World Snooker Championship
Women's World Snooker Championship
International sports competitions hosted by England
Sports competitions in Leeds
World Women's Snooker Championship